The Women's Malaysian Open Squash Championships 2014 is the women's edition of the 2014 Malaysian Open Squash Championships, which is a tournament of the WSA World Series event Gold (prize money: 70 000 $). The event took place in Kuala Lumpur in Malaysia from 18 to 23 August. Raneem El Weleily won her second Malaysian Open trophy, beating Nour El Tayeb in the final.

Prize money and ranking points
For 2014, the prize purse was $70,000. The prize money and points breakdown is as follows:

Seeds

Draw and results

See also
WSA World Series 2014
Malaysian Open Squash Championships
Men's Malaysian Open Squash Championships 2014

References

External links
WSA Malaysian Open Squash Championships website
CIMB Malaysian Open 2013 Squashsite website

Squash tournaments in Malaysia
Kuala Lumpur Open Squash Championships
Squash
2014 in women's squash
Women in Kuala Lumpur